TZC may refer to :
 Tetrazolium chloride
 Toronto Zen Centre
 TZC, IATA code for the Tuscola Area Airport
 tzc, ISO 639-3 code of the Tzotzil language